Nikulino is a rural locality (a selo) in Malyshevskoye Rural Settlement, Selivanovsky District, Vladimir Oblast, Russia. The population was 2 as of 2010.

Geography 
Nikulino is located 36 km south of Krasnaya Gorbatka (the district's administrative centre) by road. Poshatovo is the nearest rural locality.

References 

Rural localities in Selivanovsky District